Taneli Hämäläinen (born 16 April 2001), is a Finnish professional soccer player who plays as a defender for KuPS.

References

External links

2001 births
Living people
Finnish footballers
Association football defenders